Montagne des Mémises (1,674 m) is a mountain in the Chablais Alps in Haute-Savoie, France near the Franco-Swiss border. It dominates the communes of Évian-les-Bains and Thollon-les-Mémises, and provides a panoramic view over Lac Léman of the Jura Massif and the Franco-Swiss Alps.

Mountains of the Alps
Mountains of Haute-Savoie